Monmouthshire has 200 scheduled monuments.  The 46 prehistoric scheduled sites include burial sites, enclosures and 16 hill forts. Ten sites date from the Roman period, including four villas. There are four early Christian sites from early medieval times. The 101 sites from the medieval post-Norman period include spectacular castles and hidden castle mounds, remote dwellings, grand abbeys, holy wells, stones and churches. Finally the modern period has a 39 sites, including a very wide range of early industrial activities.

Scheduled monuments have statutory protection. The compilation of the list is undertaken by Cadw Welsh Historic Monuments, which is an executive agency of the Welsh Government. The list of scheduled monuments below is supplied by Cadw with additional material from RCAHMW and Glamorgan-Gwent Archaeological Trust.

Scheduled monuments in Monmouthshire

See also

List of Cadw properties
List of castles in Wales
List of hill forts in Wales
Historic houses in Wales
List of monastic houses in Wales
List of museums in Wales
List of Roman villas in Wales
Grade I listed buildings in Monmouthshire
Grade II* listed buildings in Monmouthshire
List of Scheduled Monuments in Newport
List of Scheduled Monuments in Torfaen
List of hillforts in Monmouthshire

Notes

The Cadw schedule on which this list is based makes no distinctions between different prehistoric periods. The following notes explain where period classifications have been refined, based on the (cited) records from RCAHMW and/or Glamorgan-Gwent Archaeological Trust.

References
Coflein is the online database of RCAHMW: Royal Commission on the Ancient and Historical Monuments of Wales, GGAT is the Glamorgan-Gwent Archaeological Trust, Cadw is the Welsh Historic Monuments Agency

External links

The following links are the official Cadw visitor information pages:
Bulwark Camp, Chepstow
Caerwent Roman Town
Chepstow Castle
Chepstow Port Wall
Grosmont Castle
Hen Gwrt Moated Site
Llanmelin Wood Hill Fort
Llantony Priory
Monmouth Castle
Raglan Castle
Runston Chapel
Skenfrith Castle
White Castle

Other sites for scheduled monuments in Monmouthshire:
Usk Castle - official website

Monmouthshire